Harvey Creek may refer to:

Harvey Creek (New York), a stream in New York
Harveys Creek, a stream in Pennsylvania
Harvey Creek (Wisconsin River tributary), a stream in Wisconsin